The Light fountain of the Exposición Regional Valenciana was a large fountain and square built for the Valencia Regional Exhibition of 1909. It was one of the most expensive buildings of the exhibition with a cost of 209,000 pesetas.

References

Demolished buildings and structures in Valencia
Buildings and structures completed in 1909
Art Nouveau architecture in the Valencian Community
World's fair architecture in Valencia
Fountains in Spain
Buildings and structures demolished in the 20th century